German submarine U-1051 was a Type VIIC U-boat built for Nazi Germany's Kriegsmarine for service during World War II.
She was laid down on 8 February 1943 by Friedrich Krupp Germaniawerft, Kiel as yard number 685, launched on 3 February 1944 and commissioned on 4 March 1944 under Oberleutnant zur See Heinrich von Holleben.

Design
German Type VIIC submarines were preceded by the shorter Type VIIB submarines. U-1051 had a displacement of  when at the surface and  while submerged. She had two shafts and two  propellers.

U-1051 was fitted with five  torpedo tubes (four fitted at the bow and one at the stern), fourteen torpedoes, one  SK C/35 naval gun, (220 rounds), one  Flak M42 and two twin  C/30 anti-aircraft guns. The boat had a complement of between forty-four and sixty.

Service history
The boat's career began with training at 5th U-boat Flotilla on 4 March 1944, followed by active service on 1 January 1945 as part of the 11th Flotilla and was sunk just three weeks later on her first patrol.

Wolfpacks
U-1051 took part in no wolfpacks.

Fate
All hands were lost.

Summary of raiding history

References

Notes

Citations

Bibliography

External links

German Type VIIC submarines
1944 ships
U-boats commissioned in 1944
Ships lost with all hands
U-boats sunk in 1945
U-boats sunk by depth charges
U-boats sunk by British warships
World War II shipwrecks in the Irish Sea
World War II submarines of Germany
Ships built in Kiel
Maritime incidents in January 1945